Domenic is a given name. Notable persons with that name include:

Domenic Abounader (born 1995), American wrestler
Domenic Berry (born 1971), Australian footballer (Australian rules)
Domenic Carosa (born 1974), Australian businessman
Domenic Cassisi (born 1982), Australian footballer (Australian rules)
Domenic Cretara (1946–2017), American painter
Domenic DiBerardino (born 1942), Canadian ice hockey player
Domenic Figliomeni (born 1969), Canadian boxer
Domenic Gatto (born 1955), Australian boxer, businessman, and mobster
Domenic Keller ( 2000–2001), Swiss bobsledder
Domenic Recchia (born 1959), American politician
Domenic Marte, American singer
Domenic Mediate (born 1982), American soccer player
Domenic Mobilio (1969–2004), Canadian soccer player
Domenic Pittis (born 1974), Canadian ice hockey player
Domenic Priore (born 1960), American author, historian and television producer
Domenic Sarno (born 1963), American politician
Domenic Troiano (1946–2005), Canadian guitarist
Domenic Weinstein (born 1994), German racing cyclist

See also
Dominic
Domenico
Dom (given name)

Masculine given names
English masculine given names